Josh Blankenship (born November 13, 1980) is an American football coach and former player. He is the head football coach at Broken Arrow High School in Broken Arrow, Oklahoma. Blankenship served as the head football coach at Adams State University in Alamosa, Colorado from 2018 until his resignation in January 2021. Blankenship played college football at the University of Tulsa for three years before playing his last year at Eastern Washington University. He is the son of former Tulsa head football coach Bill Blankenship. He is now the head football coach for Broken Arrow High School including a 5-7 record in 2022.

Head coaching record

College

References

External links
 Adams State profile
 Tulsa profile

1980 births
Living people
American football quarterbacks
Adams State Grizzlies football coaches
Austin Wranglers players
Eastern Washington Eagles football players
Edmonton Elks players
Miami Dolphins players
Memphis Xplorers players
Stockton Lightning players
Tulsa Golden Hurricane football players
Tulsa Talons players
High school football coaches in Oklahoma
Sportspeople from Tulsa, Oklahoma
Coaches of American football from Oklahoma
Players of American football from Oklahoma